Stephen Baron may refer to:

Stephen Baron (friar) (died 1520), English Franciscan friar
Steve Baron (born 1990), American baseball catcher

See also

Steve Barron (born 1956), Irish-born British film director and producer